King Cypress (also known as Great Cypress, or as Tibetans call it "the God of Tree") is a giant cypress tree (Cupressus gigantea) in Tibet (about 50 metres high, 5.8 metres in diameter, 0.165 acre of crown-projection-area and calculated age of 2,600 years). King Cypress is surrounded by at least 0.1 km² of ancient cypress-trees with an average height of 44 m. King Cypress is said to be the "life tree" of Tönpa Shenrab Miwoche, founder of the Bön tradition of  Tibet.

See also
 List of individual trees

References

Individual conifers
Individual trees in China
Flora of Tibet
Nyingchi